Domenico Pellegrini may refer to:

 Domenico Pellegrini Giampietro (1899–1970), fascist academic in Italy
 Domenico Pellegrini (painter) (1759–1840), painter in Milan